Joseph "Joe The Greaser" Rosenzweig (born c. 1891, year of death unknown) was an American New York City labor racketeer in the early 1900s as an ally of "Dopey" Benny Fein during the Labor Slugger Wars (1914–1917).

Biography
Born in Romania, Rosenzweig arrived in New York during the 1890s and worked as a tailor's presser for several years before forming a criminal gang around 1907. Controlling labor slugging in New York's Lower East Side, Rosenzweig's organization of around one hundred acted mostly as strikebreakers, specializing in breaking up union picket lines, demonstrations and other protests. With political protection from Tammany Hall Rosenzweig maintained complete control of strikebreaking and labor slugging well into the early 1910s.

Rosenzweig's dominance was challenged in 1913, when Philip "Pinchey" Paul began a war with Rosenzweig, lasting over several months. The war ended  with Paul's death the following year, when he was killed by Rosenzweig and several gunmen, including Jacob Heiseman, Benjamin Snyder and Hyman Berthstein. When he was later arrested for the murder Rosenzweig agreed to testify against the other gang members. Despite his testimony Rosenzweig was sentenced to ten years imprisonment, along with Snyder, to Sing Sing Prison in December 1915. Upon Rosenzweig's release in 1925 he returned to Manhattan to find his gang had long since disappeared. After he received a warning from ex-lieutenant Waxey Gordon against attempting to reform his gang he soon left New York retiring from crime thereafter.

References

Further reading
Fried, Albert. The Rise and Fall of the Jewish Gangster in America. New York: Holt, Rinehart and Winston, 1980. 
Pietrusza, David. Rothstein: The Life, Times, and Murder of the Criminal Genius Who Fixed the 1919 World Series. New York: Carroll & Graf Publishers, 2003. 
Chiocca, Olindo Romeo. Mobsters and Thugs: Quotes from the Underworld. Toronto: Guernica Editions, 2000. 
"Another Gang Head Confesses Murder; 'Joe the Greaser' Pleads Guilty and Tells of Labor Union Thuggery.", The New York Times, May 29, 1915.

1890s births
American people of Romanian-Jewish descent
Criminals from New York City
Jewish American gangsters
Romanian emigrants to the United States
Romanian Jews
Year of death missing